Lloyd J. Torchio II (born September 14, 1960) is a former American football quarterback. He played college football at California. He signed as an undrafted free agent with the San Antonio Gunslingers of the United States Football League (USFL).

College career
Torchio attended the University of California, Berkeley as a walk-on member of the Golden Bears football team from 1980-1983. In 1980, he appeared in 11 games. He completed 43-of-75 passing attempts (57.3%) for 644 yards, two touchdowns and three interceptions. That season, he was the winning quarterback in the Big Game against Stanford, led by future Pro Football Hall of Famer John Elway. In 1981, he started 11 games. He completed 155-of-363 passing attempts (42.7%) for 2,112 yards, nine touchdowns and 12 interceptions. In 1982, he returned to being a back-up and appeared in 11 games. He completed 57-of-123 passing attempts (46.3%) for 730 yards, three touchdowns and eight interceptions. In 1983, he appeared in 11 games. He completed 10-of-36 passing attempts (27.8%) for 155 yards, no touchdowns and four interceptions. He graduated with a Bachelor of Science degree in Business Administration.

Professional career
After graduating from California, Berkeley, he signed with the San Antonio Gunslingers of the United States Football League (USFL) in 1984. In 1984, he appeared in 18 games. He completed 6-of-18 passing attempts (33.3%) for 74 yards, no touchdowns and one interception. He rushed the ball four times for 18 yards (4.5 avg.). In 1985, he joined the Oakland Invaders.

Personal life
Torchio is the son of Lloyd J. Torchio, who played quarterback for the Golden Bears in 1947.

Toricho graduated with an MBA from the University of Southern California. He then began working at JP Morgan, where he worked for 12 years. Since, he has worked at Lafayette Capital Group where he is currently the company's corporate secretary. He is married to his wife Mary. They live in Lafayette, California and have three children.

References

External links
 Lafayette Capital Group official website

1960 births
Living people
American football quarterbacks
California Golden Bears football players
San Antonio Gunslingers players
Oakland Invaders players
21st-century American businesspeople